Gianluca Laurenti (born 14 April 1990) is an Italian professional footballer who plays as a midfielder for Luparense.

Club career
Born in Ferrara, Laurenti started his career in SPAL.

On 1 February 2016, he joined to Bassano.

Laurenti left Modena on 4 January 2021, and joined to Legnago the next day. On 18 January 2022, his contract with Legnago was terminated by mutual consent. On the same day, he joined Serie D club Luparense.

References

External links
 
 

1990 births
Living people
Sportspeople from Ferrara
Italian footballers
Association football midfielders
Serie C players
Serie D players
S.P.A.L. players
A.C. Mezzocorona players
Bassano Virtus 55 S.T. players
L.R. Vicenza players
Modena F.C. 2018 players
F.C. Legnago Salus players
Italy youth international footballers
Footballers from Emilia-Romagna